Events in the year 2021 in Laos.

Incumbents
 Party General Secretary: Bounnhang Vorachith (until 15 January); Thongloun Sisoulith (from 15 January)
 President: Bounnhang Vorachith
 Prime Minister: Thongloun Sisoulith
 Vice President: Phankham Viphavanh
 National Assembly President: Pany Yathotou

Events
Ongoing — COVID-19 pandemic in Laos

January

13 to 15 January – The 11th National Congress of the Lao People's Revolutionary Party is held.
15 January – The 11th Central Committee of the Lao People's Revolutionary Party is elected. Thongloun Sisoulith is elected Party General Secretary.

December
3 December - Boten-Vientiane railway officially opened.

Deaths
4 April – Keosaychay Sayasone, socialite (born 1958).

References

 

 
2020s in Laos
Years of the 21st century in Laos
Laos
Laos